Hwang Hye-youn (Hangul: 황혜연; Hanja: 黃慧淵; born April 3, 1985 in Pocheon, Gyeonggi-do) is a retired female badminton player from South Korea.

Hwang started playing badminton at 7, at her local elementary school. Hwang who educated at the Pocheon High School, competed at the 2002 Asian Junior Championships, and won the silver medal in the girls' team event. She entered the South Korea national team in 2004.  Although she won national championships in 2005 and 2006, she wasn't known internationally until she beat reigning World Champion Xie Xingfang en route to the final of the 2006 Thailand Open.  Later that year, Hwang won the bronze medal at the Doha Asian Games.  Her best Superseries result came when she reached the semi-final of the 2008 All England but that year, she suffered major disappointment when she was unable to make the top 16 to become the second Korean women's singles representative at the Beijing Olympics.

In late 2009, Hwang suffered a foot injury at a domestic event and by the time she returned to competition, her teammates Bae Seung-hee, Bae Yeon-ju, and Sung Ji-hyun had begun producing results and Hwang was not a member of Korea's Uber Cup-winning team in 2010.  She remained on the national team for several more years before retiring from international competition.  She continued to play for the Samsung Electromechanics pro team and became coach of their women's team in 2016.

Achievements

Asian Games 
Women's singles

IBF World Grand Prix
The World Badminton Grand Prix sanctioned by International Badminton Federation (IBF) since 1983.

Women's singles

BWF International Challenge/Series
Women's singles

 BWF International Challenge tournament
 BWF International Series tournament

References

South Korean female badminton players
Asian Games medalists in badminton
1985 births
Living people
Badminton players at the 2006 Asian Games
Badminton players at the 2010 Asian Games
Asian Games bronze medalists for South Korea
Medalists at the 2006 Asian Games
Medalists at the 2010 Asian Games
People from Pocheon
Sportspeople from Gyeonggi Province